Physalaemus jordanensis is a species of frog in the family Leptodactylidae.
It is endemic to Brazil.
Its natural habitats are subtropical or tropical moist lowland forests, subtropical or tropical high-altitude shrubland, subtropical or tropical high-altitude grassland, intermittent freshwater marshes, and heavily degraded former forest.
It is threatened by habitat loss.

References

jordanensis
Endemic fauna of Brazil
Taxonomy articles created by Polbot
Amphibians described in 1967